Chromosome 8 open reading frame 58 is an uncharacterised protein that in humans is encoded by the C8orf58 gene. The protein is predicted to be localized in the nucleus.

Gene 
The C8orf58 gene is located on chromosome 8 at position 8p21.3. It spans a total of 4,550 base pairs and has seven exons. C8orf58 is flanked by the genes PDLIM2 and CCAR2. There are no aliases. It is defined as a protein coding gene.

mRNA 

C8orf58 produces three transcript splice variants. The transcript of variant 1 represents the longest transcript and encodes the largest protein. It is 2,062 base pairs and contains seven exons. There are two other splice variants, produced by alternative splice sites.

C8orf58 has a relatively short 5’ region and a moderate 3’ region. Both the 5’ and 3’ regions contain stem loops. There is one predicted miRNA binding site that found in the 3’UTR of C8orf58.

Protein 
C8orf58 protein Isoform 1 is 365 amino acids long. Isoform 2 and Isoform 3 are 357 and 300 amino acids respectively. There is a kozak consensus sequence present, which confirms it is a protein coding sequence.

C8orf58 Isoform 1 has a molecular weight of 39.7 kDa and an isoelectric point of 8.29. It is proline and arginine rich and isoleucine, asparagine, phenylalanine, and tyrosine poor.

The predicted secondary structure of the C8orf58 protein include multiple alpha helices and one beta strands.

Evolutionary history 
It is part of the DUF4657 family, a family of proteins found in eukaryotes. Proteins in this family are typically between 305 and 370 amino acids in length. The Domain of Unknown Function (DUF) of C8orf58 is located between amino acids 73 to 364.

Expression 
According to the NCBI GEO profiles, C8orf58 is a narrowly expressed protein found in spleen, lung, thymus, prostate, and spinal cord tissue. It is constitutively expressed in these tissues.

Post-translational modification 
The bioinformatic tools on Expasy were used to determine potential post translational modification sites for the C8orf58 protein. There are two predicted phosphorylation sites and one predicted sumoylation site.

Subcellular localization 
According to PSORT II, C8orf58 is located in the nucleus. This is supported by the presence of a sumoylation site, which is involved in nucleic cytoplasmic transport.

Interacting proteins 
Two proteins have been found to interact with protein C8orf58, CENPH and metG1, which were found using two hybrid assay and the two hybrid pooling approach respectively. CENPH (Centromere Protein H) plays a critical role in centromere structure, kinetochore formation, and sister chromatid separation. MetG1 (Methionine—tRNA ligase) is required for elongation of protein synthesis and the initiation of all mRNA translation through initiator tRNA(fMet) aminoacylation.

Homology 
An important paralog of this gene is ENSG00000248235. Orthologs of the human gene C8orf58 are limited to vertebrates of the animal kingdom.

References